Caris Tiivel (27 February 1993) is an Australian model and beauty pageant titleholder who won Miss Universe Australia 2016. She represented Australia at Miss Universe 2016 in the Philippines.

Personal life
Tiivel hails from Perth, Western Australia where she works as a model.

Pageantry

Miss Universe Australia 2016
Tiivel was crowned Miss Universe Australia 2016 on 31 August 2016 and represented Australia at Miss Universe 2016.

Miss Universe 2016
Tiivel represented Australia at Miss Universe 2016 but failed to make the cut despite being a favorite.

References

External links
Miss Universe Australia Official website

Living people
Miss Universe 2016 contestants
Australian beauty pageant winners
Miss Universe Australia winners
Female models from Western Australia
Models from Perth, Western Australia
1993 births